Muscina levida is a species of fly from the family Muscidae. It is found in Europe.

References

Muscidae
Muscomorph flies of Europe
Insects described in 1780
Taxa named by Moses Harris